Jodie Dorday is a New Zealand actress, known for her appearances on the television series  Burying Brian (2008).

Filmography

Awards
 1999 – Best Supporting Actress  for Via Satellite

References

External links
 
 Jodie Dorday at XENAVILLE
 Interview with Jodie Dorday

Living people
1968 births
New Zealand people of Irish descent
New Zealand actresses
New Zealand film actresses
New Zealand television actresses
New Zealand soap opera actresses
People from Auckland
20th-century New Zealand actresses
21st-century New Zealand actresses